Greg Barreto is an American businessman and politician. He represented district 58 in northeastern Oregon in the State House of Representatives from January 2015 to January 2021. He is a member of the Republican Party.

House district 58 includes all of Union County and Wallowa County, as well as portions of Umatilla County.

Business career
In 1982, Barreto invented a hydraulic rototiller. He and his wife founded Barreto Manufacturing in 1984 in Keizer, Oregon, moving to La Grande, Oregon, in 1986.

Political career
Barreto was elected to the Oregon State House of Representatives in 2014. He succeeded Dean of the House, Republican Bob Jenson. Barreto was selected to serve on the Agriculture and Natural Resources Committee, Business and Labor Committee and Education Committee during the 78th Legislative Assembly.

On December 11, 2020, Barreto and 11 other state Republican officials signed a letter requesting Oregon Attorney General Ellen Rosenblum join Texas and other states contesting the results of the 2020 presidential election in Texas v. Pennsylvania. Rosenblum announced she had filed in behalf of the defense, and against Texas, the day prior.

Personal life
Barreto and his wife, Chris, a RNC National committeewomen, reside in Cove. They have eight children.

External links 
 Campaign website
 Legislative website

References

Living people
Year of birth missing (living people)
Place of birth missing (living people)
People from Cove, Oregon
20th-century American inventors
21st-century American inventors
21st-century American politicians
Businesspeople from Oregon
Republican Party members of the Oregon House of Representatives